The Greysteel massacre was a mass shooting that took place on the evening of 30 October 1993 in Greysteel, County Londonderry, Northern Ireland. Members of the Ulster Defence Association (UDA), a loyalist paramilitary group, opened fire on civilians in a crowded pub during a Halloween party, killing eight and wounding nineteen. The pub was targeted because it was frequented by Catholics, though two of the victims were Protestant. The group claimed responsibility using their cover name "Ulster Freedom Fighters", saying the attack was revenge for the Shankill Road bombing by the Provisional IRA a week earlier. Four men were sentenced to life imprisonment for the massacre, but were released in 2000 under the terms of the Good Friday Agreement.

Background
On 23 October 1993, an IRA bomb prematurely exploded as the bombers carried it into a fishmongers on the Shankill Road, Belfast. The IRA's intended target was a meeting of UDA leaders, including brigadier Johnny Adair, which was to take place in a room above the shop. Unknown to the IRA, the meeting had been rescheduled. Eight Protestant civilians, a UDA member and one of the IRA bombers were killed in the blast. This became known as the Shankill Road bombing.

The UDA launched a number of "revenge attacks" for the bombing. Later that day, they fatally shot a Catholic delivery driver after luring him to a bogus call at Vernon Court, Belfast. On 26 October, the UDA shot dead another two Catholic civilians and wounded five in an attack at the Council Depot at Kennedy Way, Belfast.

Planning
The order for the attack came from the UDA leadership and it is believed Greysteel was chosen partly because it was well away from Belfast, where security force activity was intense after the Shankill bombing. Those involved in planning and organising it included Billy McFarland, 'Brigadier' of the UDA's North Antrim & Londonderry Brigade. Stephen Irwin, Geoffrey Deeney and Torrens Knight, all members of the brigade, were to carry out the shooting. The gunmen were first briefed on the plans for the massacre on 27 October in an office owned by the Ulster Democratic Party at Bond's Place, Derry. 

Before the massacre, the gunmen went to the pub to familiarise themselves with the layout and choose the best positions to shoot from. Knight made Irwin and Deeney rehearse the shooting in the office at Bond's Place. The gunmen would drive to the pub in an Opel Kadett, with UDA member Brian McNeill driving a 'scout car' in front. After the shooting the gunmen would drive the Kadett to a pick-up point near Eglinton, where they would meet McNeill and burn the car.

Massacre
Just before 10pm on Saturday 30 October, the three gunmen, wearing blue boiler suits and balaclavas, entered the "Rising Sun Bar" in Greysteel. There were at least 70 people inside attending a Halloween party and at first some believed the men were playing a Halloween prank. Stephen Irwin yelled "trick or treat" as he opened fire with a VZ58 assault rifle on the packed crowd in the lounge. He kept shooting until the magazine emptied, quickly reloaded and continued shooting. Geoffrey Deeney opened fire with a 9mm handgun at a fleeing woman, but it jammed after one shot. Torrens Knight, armed with a shotgun, guarded the entrance while the shooting was taking place. There was panic and screaming as people scrambled for cover and women pleaded for mercy. The scene in the Rising Sun was described as "hell-like"; bodies lay everywhere and the lounge and dancefloor were covered with blood and broken glass. The gunmen, laughing, then made their escape in the Opel Kadett driven by Knight. While driving away from Greysteel, the getaway car's wing mirror was hit by a police car speeding towards the scene. 

Seven people were killed outright and nineteen were wounded, with another later dying of his wounds. The dead were Karen Thompson (19), Steven Mullan (20), Moira Duddy (59), Joseph McDermott (60), James Moore (81), John Moyne (50), John Burns (54) and Victor Montgomery (76). Six of those killed were Catholic civilians and two were Protestant civilians. 

The following day, the UDA claimed responsibility for the attack using the cover name "Ulster Freedom Fighters" (UFF). Its statement said that the "Greysteel raid" was "the continuation of our threats against the nationalist electorate that they would pay a heavy price for last Saturday's slaughter of nine Protestants". A West Belfast UDA member claimed that his organisation "had information that senior IRA men drank in the Rising Sun... Unfortunately they were not there on Halloween but our boys acted on the briefing they had been given". Afterwards, the gunmen were said to have boasted about the killings.

There was "considerable resentment" in Greysteel after the Ulster Unionist MP for the area, William Ross, didn't attend any of the funerals of the victims. Ross explained his absence by citing the angry reception Social Democratic and Labour Party MP Joe Hendron received while visiting the site of the Shankill Road bombing.

The pub is still open in Greysteel. There is a memorial to the victims outside the building that says: May their sacrifice be our path to peace.

Convictions
The UDA members involved were arrested shortly after the massacre. During their first court appearance, Knight was filmed laughing, taunting and shouting abuse at the victims' relatives as he was led from the building. In February 1995, Irwin, Deeney, Knight and McNeill were sentenced to life imprisonment for their involvement in the attack. Knight was also convicted for the Castlerock killings. In 2000, they were released early, along with other paramilitary prisoners, under the terms of the Good Friday Agreement. Irwin called the massacre "payback" and said he had "no remorse". After their release, both Irwin and Knight are believed to have joined the Neo-Nazi militant group Combat 18.

In 2005, Irwin received a four-year prison sentence for slashing a man with a knife. This meant that he also now had to serve the eight life sentences he received for the Greysteel massacre. In 2006, he abandoned an appeal against the sentences. In September 2013, Irwin was released from prison a second time after submitting an application to the Sentence Review Commissioners for early release. The commissioners ruled his application should be granted and he was released immediately.

There have been claims in the media that Knight was a paid informer for the MI5. Knight denied the claims. The investigators did not find any evidence that Knight was protected from the law.

Geoffrey Deeney's father, Hughie, was shot by the IRA but survived and died of natural causes. His brother, 
Trevor Deeney, "the unofficial spokesperson of the Loyalist LVF in Derry" was assassinated by the INLA while his brother was in jail. Geoffrey applied for compassionate release to attend the funeral.

See also
 Timeline of Ulster Defence Association actions
 Castlerock killings, a UDA mass-shooting in March 1993
 Loughinisland massacre, a UVF mass-shooting in June 1994

References

1993 in Northern Ireland
1993 mass shootings in Europe
1993 murders in the United Kingdom
1990s in County Londonderry
1990s mass shootings in the United Kingdom
20th-century mass murder in Northern Ireland
Attacks on buildings and structures in 1993
Attacks on bars in Northern Ireland
Mass murder in 1993
Mass murder in County Londonderry
Mass shootings in Northern Ireland
Massacres in Northern Ireland
Massacres in 1993
October 1993 crimes
October 1993 events in the United Kingdom
Terrorist incidents in County Londonderry
Terrorist incidents in the United Kingdom in 1993
1990s murders in Northern Ireland
1993 crimes in Ireland
The Troubles in County Londonderry
Ulster Defence Association actions